Oberdonven is a village in the commune of Flaxweiler, in south-eastern Luxembourg.  , the village had a population of 155.

Flaxweiler
Villages in Luxembourg